Reginald Lamar Cox (born May 29, 1972), known professionally as M Lamar, is an American composer, performer, and artist. He is an operatic countertenor and pianist whose work incorporates film, sculpture, installation, and performance.

Lamar is the identical twin of actress Laverne Cox, and played his sister's character pre-transition in two episodes of the Netflix show Orange Is the New Black.

Early life and career 

Reginald Lamar Cox was born in Mobile, Alabama, and as a child sang as a soprano in his church's choir. He studied painting at the San Francisco Art Institute and attended Yale for graduate school in sculpture before dropping out to focus on music. He moved to New York primarily to pursue vocal training with Ira Siff, founder and lead soprano of La Gran Scena Opera Company.

In 2014, Lamar participated in an open dialogue with authors bell hooks, Marci Blackman, and Samuel R. Delany called "Transgressive Sexual Practice" as part of hooks’ work as scholar-in-residence at The New School. He has cited the writing of hooks and Toni Morrison, as well as operatic composer Diamanda Galás’s Plague Mass, as inspirations for his work.

One Archive and the University of Southern California commissioned Lamar's Funeral Doom Spiritual, which premiered in 2016 as both a performance and multimedia installation with objects, videos, and prints. The work is loosely based on the life and death of Willie Francis, a Black American charged with having murdered a 53-year-old white man at the age of 15; Francis's case only received significant attention when he survived an attempted execution by electric chair, after which the NAACP spoke with him and learned the two had been in a sexual relationship. This event led to further development of Funeral Doom Spiritual, which had its conceptual origins in Lamar's studies of representations of blackness, black masculinity, interracial desire, and the intersection of Michel Foucault’s work on the panopticon with Frantz Fanon’s writings on internalized racism and the white gaze.

In 2016, Lamar received a grant from the Jerome Foundation to compose the work Lordship and Bondage: The Birth of the Negro Superman for the Living Earth Show. The work's libretto includes quotes from John Coltrane, Sun Ra, Ornette Coleman, Cecil Taylor, Nietzsche, and Hegel.

Lamar coined the terms "Negrogothic" and "doom spirituals" to describe his aesthetics and work. Exceeding his own "goth" style, Lamar says the Negrogothic "circulates horror genres with colonial-racial questions" and is "about horror and romance together, the condition of black people in the American project." These rhetorical innovations are related to his valuing "self-construction", specificity, and illegibility as means of preventing the reduction and appropriation of African American art.

In 2022 Lamar appeared on the ABC show Claim to Fame under the pseudonym "X". He was eliminated in the third episode when his celebrity relative was guessed.

Discography

See also
 LGBT culture in New York City

References

1972 births
American male composers
21st-century American composers
African-American artists
American male artists
Identical twins
Twin musicians
Living people
Musicians from Mobile, Alabama
American twins
21st-century American male musicians
American heavy metal singers
20th-century American male opera singers
21st-century African-American male singers
African-American male opera singers
Operatic countertenors
African-American pianists